The Monty (formerly known as The Full Monty) is a UK-based party covers band from Chobham, Surrey. 

The Monty was formed in 1998 to help raise money for a charity at their local rugby club in Chobham. Their first gig helped raise a substantial amount for the charity, and se the band on the road to success. Their first gig attracted critical acclaim, and in came the offers for more gigs. They became the resident band at the club, and performed regularly at parties, fund raisers and other events. Since then, their popularity has grown and now regularly play to packed houses.

Discography 
 Live at Shepherd's Bush (2003)

Members 
 David Williams – Lead vocals, Compare, Master of Ceremonies
 David Frazier – Lead guitar, Backing vocals
 Nigel Shore –  Vocals, Rhythm Guitar
 Rob Goodwin –  drums
 Ed Hintze – Keyboards
 Ludo Graham – Bass

External links
www.themonty.co.uk (Official Site)

People from Chobham, Surrey